Cambio 16 is a Spanish language monthly current affairs magazine published in Madrid, Spain, by "Group 16".

History and profile
Cambio 16 was first published as a weekly in September 1971 and played an important media role during the Spanish political transition from the Francoist State to democracy. The editors originally wanted to name it Cambio, but the government insisted on a longer title before allowing it to be registered, so it was changed to Cambio 16 in honor of the magazine's sixteen founders. The founders were those who focused on change in Spain. Grupo 16, the owner of the weekly, also launched Diario 16, Motor 16 as well as the station Radio 16.

The headquarters of Cambio 16 is in Madrid. The magazine is similar to Time and Newsweek in terms of its content. It also publishes issues in Catalonia under the name Canvi Setze and in the Basque Country as Aldaketa Hamasei. 

The first director of Cambio 16 was Juan Tomás de Salas from 1972 until 1976 when he was replaced by José Oneto who ran the magazine until 1986. Then Ricardo Utrilla took over in 1986, Enrique Badía in 1988, Luis Díaz Güell in 1989 and de Salas once again in 1991 until 1994, followed by Román Orozco from 1994 until 1996. Gorka Landáburu took over in 2003 until presently.

Cambio 16 has a center-progressive and mainstream political stance. The US Department of State described the magazine as a centrist publication in 2000.

Cambio 16 was suspended several times in the Francoist State until the approval of the new Spanish Constitution in 1978. It is a pioneer publication in investigative journalism in Spain together with now defunct newspaper Diario 16.

The 1993 circulation of Cambio 16 was about 90,000 copies.

See also
 List of magazines in Spain

References

External links
 

1971 establishments in Spain
Censorship in Spain
Investigative journalism
Magazines established in 1971
Magazines published in Madrid
News magazines published in Spain
Political magazines published in Spain
Spanish-language magazines
Spanish transition to democracy
Weekly magazines published in Spain
Monthly magazines published in Spain